Signal (stylized as SIGNAL) is an otome game released on December 3, 2009 by D3 Publisher for Nintendo DS, in both a standard and a limited edition. It is part of a series including the PlayStation 2 game , sequel to the PC game Darling. Its CERO rating is D (17+).

References

External links 
Darling Special Backlash Koi no Exhaust Heat official website

2009 video games
Nintendo DS games
Nintendo DS-only games
D3 Publisher games
Otome games
Romance video games
Single-player video games
Visual novels
Video games developed in Japan
Japan-exclusive video games